Otto Eisenmann (26 February 1913 – 19 February 2002) was a German politician of the Free Democratic Party (FDP) and former member of the German Bundestag.

Life 
From 1954 to 26 October 1957 Eisenmann was a member of the Landtag in Schleswig-Holstein; he had been elected to the Land parliament via the list of the electoral alliance of the Schleswig-Holstein bloc, which the DP had formed with the Schleswig-Holstein Community. From 1957 to 1 June 1967 he was a member of the German Bundestag. From 1967 to 20 January 1968 he was again a member of the state parliament in Schleswig-Holstein.

Literature

References

1913 births
2002 deaths
Members of the Bundestag for Schleswig-Holstein
Members of the Bundestag 1965–1969
Members of the Bundestag 1961–1965
Members of the Bundestag 1957–1961
Members of the Bundestag for the Free Democratic Party (Germany)
Members of the Landtag of Schleswig-Holstein
Ministers of the Schleswig-Holstein State Government